The People of the Year Awards was an annual award show in Ireland. Organised by the Rehab Group, it was televised by Raidió Teilifís Éireann (RTÉ).

The Awards provided a unique opportunity for the Irish public to honour outstanding contributions made by individuals and organisations to life in Ireland.

The 2018 edition took place on Sunday 15 April and was hosted by Gráinne Seoige and Aidan Power. No ceremony was planned for 2019.

Notable winners

 Adrian Donohoe 
 Ifrah Ahmed
 Willie Bermingham
 Maeve Binchy
 Panti Bliss
 Mary Dunlop
 Bob Geldof
 Veronica Guerin
 Pádraig Harrington
 Seamus Heaney
 Christy Moore
 John Hume
 Brian Keenan
 Ronan Kerr
 Rory McIlroy
 George J. Mitchell
 Mo Mowlam
 Daráine Mulvihill
 Niall Quinn
 Keith Duffy
 Nuala O'Loan
 John O'Shea (humanitarian) 
 Joe Dolan
 Gerry Ryan
 Katie Taylor
 Catherine Corless
 Tony Scott
Tomi Reichental

References

External links
 
 
 RTÉ 2011 People of the Year Awards gallery
 RTÉ 2012 People of the Year Awards gallery

Annual events in Ireland
Irish awards
RTÉ original programming
Awards established in 1975
Awards disestablished in 2018